James Patrick Culhane Jr. (born August 13, 1942) is an American gymnast. He competed in eight events at the 1972 Summer Olympics.

References

External links
 
 

1942 births
Living people
American male artistic gymnasts
Olympic gymnasts of the United States
Gymnasts at the 1972 Summer Olympics
Sportspeople from Rochester, New York